This is a list of villages in Europe by country:

List of villages in Bulgaria
List of villages in Northern Ireland
Lists of villages in Norway
List of populated places in Serbia

See also
List of cities in Europe
Europe

Europe

Villages